This is a list of commemorative coins issued by the Central Bank of Russia in 1992:

References

1992
Commemorative coins